The University Tahri Mohamed Béchar is a university located in Béchar, Algeria. It was established in 1986;1992;2009.

Enrollment and staffing

As of the 2014–2015 academic year, there were 14,000 students enrolled at the university and a total of 600 academic staff.

Faculties

The university has eight (8) faculties: 
All university fields are brought together at the University of Béchar, which offers six main areas:
 Science and technology: the Faculty of Science and Technology.
 Economics and management: the Faculty of Economic Sciences, Commercial Sciences, and Management Sciences.
 Letters and languages: the Faculty of Letters and Languages.
 Law and political science: the Faculty of Law and Political Science.
 Human and social sciences: the Faculty of Human and Social Sciences
 Health: the Faculty of Medicine.

Facilities

The university has 10 conference rooms, 13 amphitheatres, 2 libraries, 16 computer rooms, and 72 teachers' offices.

There are 4 chemistry laboratories, 4 biology laboratories, 5 physics laboratories, 7 electronics  laboratories, 7 electrotechnical laboratories, 5 engineering laboratories, a hydraulic laboratory, a languages laboratory, and 2 mechanical engineering workshops.

There are two research facilities; one is in the Department of Chemistry, and the other is an Energy Physics Laboratory.

Cooperations

The university has cooperative ties with four universities in other countries:
University of Lancaster, United Kingdom
University of Ancona, Italy
University of Perpignan, France
Ibnou Zohr University, Morocco

See also 
 List of universities in Algeria

References

External links
 Official website

1986 establishments in Algeria
Educational institutions established in 1986
Bechar
Buildings and structures in Béchar Province